Spiranthes parksii, the  Navasota ladies' tresses, is a species of orchid that is endemic to Texas, United States. The flower was first discovered in 1945 and was first described by Donovan Stewart Correll in his 1950 book, Native Orchids of North America North of Mexico.

Description
Leaves are long and thin and found mostly near the ground level, but usually disappear when the flower buds. Flowers petals are round or oval and off-white in color. The flowers typically spiral up the stem. Conspicuously white-tipped bracts occur underneath each  flower. The side petals have a green central stripe, and the lip (bottom petal) is distinctly ragged.

Habitat and range
Navasota ladies' tresses is primarily found in the East Central Texas forests, usually along creeks in the Brazos and Navasota River watersheds. In 1982, when the species was listed as endangered, only two populations were believed to exist, both in Brazos County. Since then, biologists have identified the species in Bastrop, Burleson, Fayette, Freestone, Grimes, Jasper, Leon, Madison, Milam, Robertson, and Washington Counties. The population in Jasper County is disjunct and the only one that occurs in the Piney Woods.

Conservation 
Navasota ladies' tresses was listed as an endangered species by the United States Fish and Wildlife Service (USFWS) in May 1982. The decline of the plant is mostly due to loss of habitat from human encroachment and activity.

References 

parksii
Plants described in 1947
Endemic orchids of the United States
Endemic flora of Texas